Holly Somerville is an Irish botanical artist, illustrator and teacher. She has worked for Trinity College, Dublin, and produced the botanical illustrations for the seventh edition of David Webb's An Irish Flora.

Career 
Born Holly Nixon in Dublin and went to St Columba's College, Dublin. Somerville has lived in the Glen of Imaal for the past 13 years. She and her family live in an 18th-century farmhouse in Stratford on Slaney where she also paints in her studio overlooking Lugnaquilla mountain.

Somerville was educated at Oxford where she completed a master's degree in Plant Sciences at Somerville College. She then completed her education in Edinburgh College of Art with a BA in illustration and photography. Post college in 1994 she was employed by the department of botany in Trinity College, Dublin to assist with specimen illustration.  This led to her botanical illustrations for the seventh edition of David Webb's An Irish Flora. This work on botanical illustration brought her commissions from universities across the world. She later taught botanical watercolour at Trinity Botanic Gardens in Dartry.

Somerville is involved in Bloom, the gardening event held each year in the Phoenix Park.

Exhibitions
 2017, 2016 Water Colour Society of Ireland Annual Exhibition
 2017, 2016, 2015, 2014, 2013 Botanical Art in Bloom
 2017 Eireannach, National Botanic Gardens, Glasnevin, Dublin
 2016, 2015, 2013, 2011 Royal Hibernian Academy Annual Exhibition
 2016 Plandaí Oidreachta, Irish Heritage Plants, National Botanic Gardens, Glasnevin, Dublin
 2016 Art in the Garden Exhibition, Tourin House, County Waterford
 2016 New Little Habitats, Ballydorn, County Down, Northern Ireland
 2015, 2013 Galway Garden Festival Botanical Art Exhibition, Claregalway Castle 
 2014 Aibitir: the Irish Alphabet in Botanical Art, National Botanic Gardens, Dublin
 2010 Grangecon Cafe, Blessington, Co. Wicklow (solo)
 2001 The Garden House, Enniskerry, Co. Wicklow (solo)
 1999 The Kennedy Gallery, Dublin (solo)
 1999 Exhibition of National Trust Paintings, Ulster Museum, Belfast
 1998 Ulster Cancer Foundation Annual Exhibition, Belfast
 1998 Gloucestershire Society for Botanical Illustration Annual Exhibition, Corinium Museum, Cirencester, UK
 1996 Royal Ulster Academy Summer Exhibition, Ulster Museum, Belfast
 1996 Artists’ Day on Botanical Illustration, Botany Department, Oxford University, UK
 1995 The Bay Tree Gallery, Holywood, Co Down (solo)
 1994 Malone House, Summer Exhibition, Belfast

Her work is on display in The National Trust, and Trinity College, Dublin. She is a Fellow of the Ballinglen Arts Foundation, Ballycastle, County Mayo.

Awards
2015 Somerville won three medals for her work in Bloom.

Personal life
Holly was married in 1999 to James Somerville with whom she has three girls: Beatrice, Poppy and Eliza.  Eliza is the oldest and appeared in the film School Life, by Neasa Ní Chianáin and David Rane.

References

External links
Botanical Artists
Official Homepage

Year of birth missing (living people)
Living people
Botanical illustrators
Irish illustrators
Irish women painters
21st-century Irish painters
21st-century Irish women artists
Alumni of Somerville College, Oxford